Kuttampuzha  is a village and gram panchayat in Ernakulam district in the Indian state of Kerala. Situated 71km east of Kochi, Kuttampuzha panchayat is home to the 17.7% of total area of the Ernakulam District.

The village has a large area under thick forest. There is a significant tribal population in the village (17.2% of total population). 

This village was part of Idukki district till 1998. Then the district borders were reorganised and the village was shifted to Ernakulam district. Following this Palakkad district became the largest district in Kerala followed by Idukki. This change also helped Ernakulam to share boundary with neighbouring state of Tamil Nadu, and to be a part of the Anamalais. Kuttampuzha panchayat was split with the formation of Edamalakkudy panchayat in 2010.

Demographics
As of 2011 Census, Kuttampuzha village had a population of 24,799 with 12,554 males and 12,245 females. Kuttampuzha had an average literacy of 89.4% higher than the national average of 74% and lower than state average of 94%: male literacy was 92% and female literacy was 86.7%.

References

Villages in Ernakulam district